Turn Around is the fifth studio album by American blues guitarist Jonny Lang, released on September 19, 2006 (see 2006 in music). On February 11, 2007, it won the Grammy Award for Best Rock or Rap Gospel Album.

Track listing
"Intro" – :17
"Bump in the Road" (Drew Ramsey, Shannon Sanders, Jonny Lang) – 3:40
"One Person at a Time" (Drew Ramsey, Shannon Sanders, Jonny Lang) – 3:02
"The Other Side of the Fence" (Drew Ramsey, Shannon Sanders, Jonny Lang) – 3:04
"Turn Around" (Drew Ramsey, Aaron Pearce, Jonny Lang, David Lee) – 4:41
"My Love Remains" (Drew Ramsey, Shannon Sanders, Jonny Lang, Steven Curtis Chapman) – 3:51
"Thankful" (Drew Ramsey, Shannon Sanders, Jonny Lang) – 4:04 - Featuring Michael McDonald
"Only a Man" (Jonny Lang) – 4:15
"Don't Stop (For Anything)" (Drew Ramsey, Shannon Sanders, Jonny Lang) – 5:00
"Anything's Possible" (Drew Ramsey, Shannon Sanders, Jonny Lang) – 3:49
"Last Goodbye" (Drew Ramsey, Jonny Lang) – 3:56
"On My Feet Again" (Drew Ramsey, Shannon Sanders, Reeve Carney, Jonny Lang) – 4:23
"That Great Day" (Drew Ramsey, Jonny Lang) – 4:36
"It's Not Over" (Drew Ramsey, Shannon Sanders, Jonny Lang) – 5:32
"Outro" – :50

Personnel
 Jonny Lang - lead vocals, lead guitar, acoustic guitar, acoustic piano
 Drew Ramsey - rhythm guitar, synthesizer
 Shannon Sanders - organ
 Michael Bland - drums
 Jim Anton - bass guitar

Additional performers
 Aaron Pearce - Wurlitzer organ
 Javier Solis - percussion
 Dave Davidson - violin
 David Angell - violin
 Kristin Wilkinson - viola
 Anthony Lamarchina - cello
 Michael McDonald - piano, vocals
 Sara Watkins - fiddle
 Haylie Lang - vocals
 Quentin Ware - trumpet
 Jim Horn - baritone saxophone
 Doug Moffet - tenor saxophone
 Barry Green - trombone
 Chris Dunn - trombone
 Buddy Miller - guitar
 Sam Bush - mandolin
 Kenny Meeks - upright bass, hurdy-gurdy

The Jonny Lang Thankful Choir
 Jonny Lang
 Drew Ramsey
 Shannon Sanders
 Matthew Johnson
 Danelle Corbin
 Ametria Dock
 Chimere Scott
 Jackie Wilson
 Rebecca Shocklee
 Dean Esther
 Kim Keyes
 Cynthia Matthews
 Aaron Pearce

External links
 Exclusive Interview with Jonny Lang
 StarPulse.com 
 Soulshine
 Atlantic City Weekly

References

Jonny Lang albums
2006 albums
Grammy Award for Best Rock or Rap Gospel Album